

Sponsorship

Club

Coaching staff
{|class="wikitable"
|-
!Position
!Staff
|-
|General Manager|| Aung Tun Oo
|-
|rowspan="1"|Head Coach||  Aung Kyaw Moe
|-
|Assistant Coach||  Zaw Lay Aung
|-
|Assistant Coach|| Yan Paing
|-

Other information

|-

2019 Players squad

Out on loan

Transfer In

Transfer Out

Competition

Myanmar National League

Table

Matches

General Aung San Shield

References

External links
 2019 Myanmar National League

Myanmar National League